= Wattkopf =

Mountain in Baden-Württemberg, Germany

Coordinates: 48°56′N 8°26′E

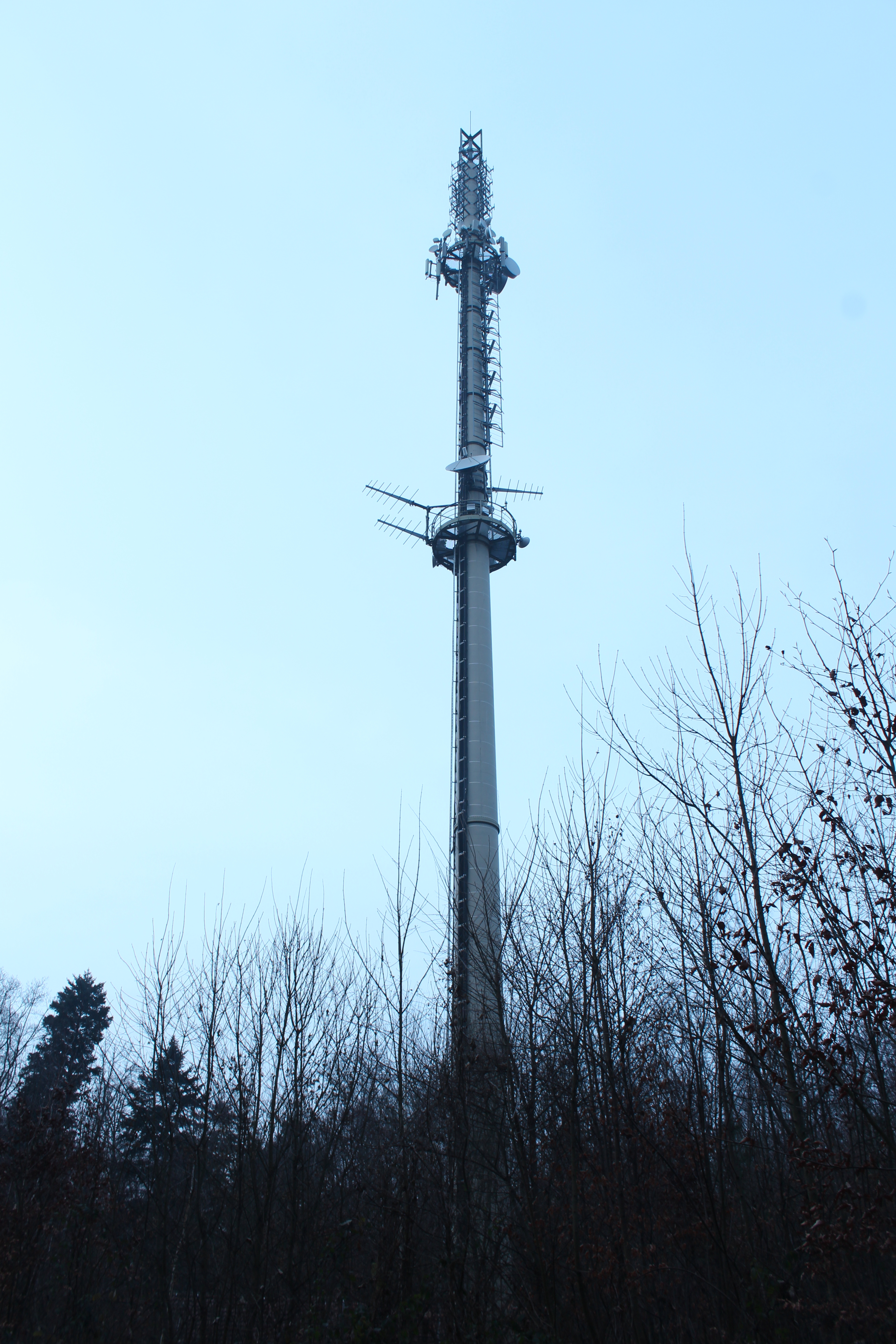
- Wattkopf Transmission Tower.

Highest point
- Elevation: 338 m (1,109 ft)

Geography
- Location: Baden-Württemberg, Germany

Wattkopf is a mountain of Baden-Württemberg, Germany.
